Varg Veum is the central character in a series of crime novels, written by the Norwegian author Gunnar Staalesen, about a private detective  who lives in Bergen, on the west coast of Norway. The books have been translated into several languages, including English, Spanish, German, and Swedish.

In the series there are 19 novels, two short story compilations and an additional short story, a collaboration (1993) with writer Fredrik Skagen, in which Veum meets a hero of Skagen's books, Morten Martens.

List of novels

 Bukken til havresekken (The Buck to the Sack of Oats) (1977)
 Din, til døden (Yours Until Death) (1979) *
 Tornerose sov i hundre år (Sleeping Beauty Slept for One Hundred Years) (1980)
 Kvinnen i kjøleskapet (The Woman in the Fridge) (1981)
 I mørket er alle ulver grå (At Night All Wolves Are Grey) (1983) *
 Hekseringen (The Witches Circle) (includes 7 Varg Veum stories) (1985)
 Svarte får (Black Sheep) (1988) *
 Falne engler (Fallen Angels) (1989) *
 Bitre blomster (Bitter Flowers) (1991)
 Begravde hunder biter ikke (Buried Dogs Do Not Bite) (1993)
 Dødelig madonna (Lethal Madonna) (collaborative story with Fredrik Skagen) (1993)
 Skriften på veggen (The Writing on the Wall) (1995) *
 De døde har det godt (The Dead Have It Easy) (8 stories) (1996)
 Som i et speil (As If In A Mirror) (2002)
 Ansikt til ansikt (Face to Face) (2004)
 Dødens drabanter (The Consorts of Death) (2006) *
 Kalde hjerter (Cold Hearts) (2008) *
 Vi skal arve vinden (We Shall Inherit The Wind) (2010) *
 Der hvor roser aldri dør (Where Roses Never Die) (2012) *
 Ingen er så trygg i fare (Wolves in the Dark) (2014) *
 Storesøster (Big Sister) (2016) *
 Utenfor er hundene (Wolves at the Door) (2018) *

* Available in English.

Films

Production history
In film adaptations, private detective Varg Veum is portrayed by Norwegian actor Trond Espen Seim.

In 2005 the Norwegian film production company SF Norge announced they would produce six films based on the books. The first film, Bitre Blomster (Bitter Flowers), opened in cinemas in Norway September 28, 2007. The film was directed by the Norwegian director Ulrik Imtiaz Rolfsen, who was previously known for the 2005 comedy crime film Izzat.

The second and third films, Tornerose (Sleeping Beauty) and Din til døden (Yours Until Death), were directed by Erik Richter Strand, a director who had won awards both in Europe and in the United States for his previous films. Both went direct to DVD.

The fourth film, Falne engler (Fallen Angels), was directed by Morten Tyldum, who later became well known after his 2011 film direction of the Jo Nesbø novel Hodejegerne (Headhunters). It received a cinema release.

The fifth and sixth films, Kvinnen i kjøleskapet (The Woman in the Fridge) and Begravde hunder (Buried Dogs) respectively, were directed by Alexander Eik and released direct to DVD.

In 2009 it was announced that six more of the Varg Veum novels would be filmed. The second series films were released theatrically in Norway. All titles have been since then released both on DVD and on Blu-ray.

The first of these was Skriften på veggen (The Writing on the Wall), directed by Stefan Faldbakken, a director of commercials.

Svarte får (Black Sheep) was directed by the television director Stephan Apelgren, best known for directing many of the Swedish detective Kurt Wallander crime films. Apelgren continued directing duties on the next film in the series, Dødens drabanter (Consorts of Death).

The tenth film, I mørket er alle ulver grå (At Night All Wolves Are Grey), saw the return of director Alexander Eik.

The eleventh film, De døde har det godt (The Dead Have It Easy), is the only one not directly based on a Varg Veum novel but rather combined elements from several short stories from the compilation of the same title.

The last film, Kalde hjerter (Cold Hearts), was co-written and directed by lead actor Seim.

List of films

First series
 Bitre blomster (Bitter Flowers) (September 2007)
 Tornerose (Sleeping Beauty) (January 2008)
 Din til døden (Yours Until Death) (March 2008)
 Falne engler (Fallen Angels) (April 2008)
 Kvinnen i kjøleskapet (The Woman In The Fridge) (September 2008)
 Begravde hunder (Buried Dogs) (October 2008)

Second series
 Skriften på veggen (The Writing on the Wall) (November 2010)
 Svarte får (Black Sheep) (January 2011)
 Dødens drabanter (Consorts of Death) (April 2011)
 I mørket er alle ulver grå (At Night All Wolves Are Grey) (November 2011)
 De døde har det godt (The Dead Have It Easy) (January 2012)
 Kalde hjerter (Cold Hearts) (March 2012)

References

External links
 Official site
 Plot summaries in English of the films in the first series of Varg Veum
 2010 interview with Gunnar Staalsen from The Scotsman

Fictional private investigators
Fictional Norwegian people
Bergen
Action film series